Heroic (1921–1939) was an Australian Thoroughbred racehorse who won 21 races from 5 furlongs (1,000 metres) to 2 miles (3,200m) and was a leading sire in Australia.

Breeding
Heroic was sired by Valais (by the 1905 Epsom Derby winner, Cicero), his dam was Chersonese (GB) by Cyglad. This made him inbred twice in the 3rd generation to Cyllene and in the 3rd and 4th generations (4x3) to Illuminata through the half sisters Gas, dam of Cicero and Chelandry. Heroic was a brother to the useful sire, Thracian and a half-brother to the stakeswinner, Cimbrian.

Heroic was an outstanding type of yearling that fetched the top price of 1,800 guineas at the Inglis’ bloodstock sales.

Racing record
He was trained by Jack Holt who posthumously would become part of the 2001 inaugural class inducted in the Australian Racing Hall of Fame.

At two years: 1923-1924
Heroic’s stakes wins were:
1923 AJC Breeders Plate 5 furlongs 
1923 VRC Maribyrnong Plate 5 furlongs 
1924 AJC Champagne Stakes   6 f 
1924 VRC Ascot Vale Stakes 6 furlongs 
During this season he had a total of 10 race starts for 6 wins and 2 thirds.

At three years: 1924-1925
His stakes wins were:
1924 AJC Australian Derby 12 furlongs 
1924 Chelmsford Stakes over 9 furlongs, defeating Gloaming by 1½ lengths.
1924 VATC Caulfield Guineas 8 furlongs
Following this race Heroic’s nominations for the VRC Derby and Melbourne Cup were rejected. This was as a result of Heroic’s connections being disqualified because of their failure to allow a stable-mate to race on his merits.
 
In February 1925,  C.B. Kellow paid 16,000 guineas, a record price, for the great Heroic, who won a number of races for him afterwards including his only other win for the season, the weight for age (w.f.a.) AJC Autumn Stakes over 12 furlongs.

At four years: 1925-1926
Heroic’s principal wins for this season were:
1925 VATC Memsie Stakes 9F 
1925 w.f.a. Caulfield Stakes 9F 
1926 VRC Newmarket Handicap with 9 st 8 lbs (61 kg) 
1926 w.f.a. AJC Cumberland Stakes over 14 furlongs defeating the good horse, Windbag.
During this season Heroic had 18 starts for 4 wins and 9 placings.

At five years: 1926-1927
Starting his five-year-old racing season in Melbourne Heroic won his first six starts against top horses. These wins were:
1926 w.f.a. Williamstown Underwood Stakes 8 furlongs 
1926 VATC Memsie Stakes over 9F carrying 9 st 11 lbs (62 kg) and beating Manfred.
1926 w.f.a. W. S. Cox Plate 10F 
1927 MVRC William Reid Stakes 6F 
1927 Wmtn RC C F Orr Stakes 8F 
1927 VATC St George Stakes 9F

He was then unplaced in the VRC Newmarket Handicap before he finished second to Spearfelt in the VRC Governors Plate. At his next start he won the VRC King's Plate. Taken to Sydney he failed to place in his next four starts and was retired.

Stud record
Heroic was leased from Kellow by H.S. Thompson and stood at his Tarwyn Park Stud at Bylong, New South Wales.

He was no less dominating as a sire, leading the Australian sire list continuously from the 1932/1933 season through the 1938/1939 season.

During his seasons at stud he sired 29 stakes-winners that had 110 stakes-wins between them earning £293,849 in Australia and New Zealand, including: 
Ajax II (31 stakes-wins, including 18 consecutive race wins)
Cereza (AJC Adrian Knox Stakes, AJC CW Cropper Plate (twice), VRC Standish Handicap) 
D'Artagnan (WATC CB Cox Stakes, WATC Sires' Produce Stakes etc.) 
Gallantic (NZ ) (VRC Oaks Stakes, AJC Adrian Knox Stakes) 
Hall Mark (15 stakes-wins including Melbourne Cup)
Hua (VRC Victoria Derby, VRC Sires' Produce Stakes, C F Orr Stakes, VRC St Leger Stakes, William Reid Stakes etc.) 
Heroic Prince (VRC Essendon Stakes, VRC Australian Cup)
Heroic's Double (Stradbroke Handicap)
Herolage (QLD Tattersall's Cup, Brisbane Cup) 
Heros (AUS) (William Reid Stakes (twice), VATC Futurity Stakes) 
Nuffield (VRC Sires' Produce Stakes, Caulfield Guineas, AJC Sires' Produce Stakes, VRC Victoria Derby, AJC Derby, Maribyrnong Plate 
The Marne (Canterbury Stakes, AJC Challenge Stakes, NSW Tramway, AJC The Shorts) 
Valiant Chief (VRC C.M. Lloyd Stakes, Moonee Valley Stakes, Linlithgow Stakes, VATC Memsie Stakes)

Heroic died on 12 December 1939 at age seventeen and was buried at Growee Gulf Station, near Rylstone, New South Wales.

Pedigree

References

 Australian Racing Hall of Fame

1921 racehorse births
1939 racehorse deaths
Thoroughbred family 1-n
Racehorses bred in Australia
Racehorses trained in Australia
Australian Racing Hall of Fame horses
Cox Plate winners
Champion Thoroughbred Sires of Australia